Lowry McElvain "Larry" Stoops (1892 – May 14, 1969)  was an  American football and basketball coach and an athletic administrator. He spent two seasons as the head football coach at West Liberty University where he compiled a 5–10–2 from 1924 to 1925. He also served as the head basketball coach at West Liberty for the 1923–1924 and 1925–1926 seasons where he accumulated a 10–11 record.

Beginning in 1926, he served as the assistant athletic director at West Virginia University until his retirement in 1962.

References

External links
 WVU Hall of Fame profile
 

1892 births
1969 deaths
Baseball outfielders
West Liberty Hilltoppers football coaches
West Liberty Hilltoppers men's basketball coaches
West Virginia Mountaineers baseball players
West Virginia University people
People from Tustin, California
People from Washington County, Pennsylvania
Baseball players from Pennsylvania